KDYL may refer to:

ICAO code for Doylestown Airport 
KDYL (AM) (1060 AM) licensed to South Salt Lake City, Utah, United States
KNIT (AM) (1320 kHz) licensed to Salt Lake City, Utah, United States, which held the KDYL call sign from 1922 to 1959
KIHU (1010 AM) licensed to Tooele, Utah, which held the KDYL call sign from 1960 to 1982
KZNS (AM) (1280 AM) licensed to Salt Lake City which held the KDYL call sign from 1982 to 2001
KBEE (98.7 FM) licensed to Salt Lake City, Utah, which held the KDYL-FM call sign from 1947 to 1959
KTVX (channel 4) licensed to Salt Lake City, Utah, United States, which held the KDYL-TV call sign from 1948 to 1953